Bruno Stephan (1907 – 1981) was a German cinematographer.

Selected filmography
 Commissioner Eyck (1940)
 Left of the Isar, Right of the Spree (1940)
 The Big Game (1942)
 The Little Residence (1942)
 Paracelsus (1943)
 The Millionaire (1947)
 Insolent and in Love (1948)
 Five Suspects (1950)
 A Rare Lover (1950)
 The Woman from Last Night (1950)
 Three Girls Spinning (1950)
 Stips (1951)
 I Was an Ugly Girl (1955)
 Queen of the Night (1951)
 Oh, You Dear Fridolin (1952)
 The Imaginary Invalid (1952)
 A Thousand Red Roses Bloom (1952)
 Knall and Fall as Detectives (1953)
 The Mill in the Black Forest (1953)
 Come Back (1953)
 The Beginning Was Sin (1954)
 Love's Carnival (1955)
 My Aunt, Your Aunt (1956)
 Inspector Hornleigh Intervenes (1961, TV)

References

Bibliography
 Rolf Giesen. Nazi Propaganda Films: A History and Filmography. McFarland, 2003.

External links

1907 births
1981 deaths
German cinematographers
Film people from Berlin